Saint Andrew's Episcopal Church, also known as Calvary-Saint Andrew's Presbyterian Church, is a historic Episcopal church complex located at Rochester in Monroe County, New York.  Designed by Richard M. Upjohn, it was constructed in phases between 1873 and 1880.  The Gothic Revival style brick and stone complex consists of two interconnected sections: the church, composed of the church, bell tower, and entry porch, and the original rectory and chapel. The high altar and window were designed by George Hausshalter.  The window was made by the Tiffany studios of New York.  In 1968, the Saint Andrew's Episcopal Church merged with Calvary Presbyterian Church to form Calvary St. Andrews, a Presbyterian parish.

It was listed on the National Register of Historic Places in 2006.  It is located in the South Wedge Historic District.

References

External links
Calvary St. Andrews | Presbyterian Parish

Churches on the National Register of Historic Places in New York (state)
Episcopal church buildings in New York (state)
Gothic Revival church buildings in New York (state)
Churches completed in 1873
19th-century Episcopal church buildings
Churches in Rochester, New York
Richard Michell Upjohn church buildings
National Register of Historic Places in Rochester, New York
Historic district contributing properties in New York (state)